The Alyahya dynasty, along with the Al-Sulaim dynasty have been the historic rulers of Unaizah, a major city in the Qasim region and in the Saudi Arabian Najd plateau in general. They are genealogically related to the Al-Sulaim Dynasty, falling under the Bani Thor section of the Subaea tribe. Prince Saleh bin Yahya bin Saleh Alyahya was the major ruler from this dynasty in Oneizah, he was removed from his position by Abdulaziz bin Mitieb Al-Rasheed.

References

History of Saudi Arabia
Arab dynasties